Beam Therapeutics Inc. is an American biotechnology company conducting research in the field of gene therapies and genome editing. The company is headquartered in Cambridge, Massachusetts. In the development of therapies, the company relies on CRISPR and  prime editing, whereby single nucleotides in a DNA sequence can be modified without cutting the DNA, theoretically reducing the likelihood of off-target effects compared to previous CRISPR-based methods.

History 
Founded in 2017, the company traces its origins to the Broad Institute of the Massachusetts Institute of Technology and Harvard University. Co-founders include David R. Liu and Feng Zhang. Prior to its IPO, the company raised nearly $1 billion in venture capital from investors. In a February 2020 IPO, the company raised $180 million.

In January 2022, Pfizer and Beam Therapeutics announced a collaboration to develop therapies for rare diseases using CRISPR.

See also

CRISPR Therapeutics
Intellia Therapeutics
Editas Medicine

References

External links 
 

American companies established in 2017
Biotechnology companies of the United States
Gene therapy
Health care companies based in Massachusetts
Pharmaceutical companies of the United States
Life sciences industry
2020 initial public offerings
Companies listed on the Nasdaq